Fair Harbor is a small community hamlet located near the western end of Fire Island. It is a part of the Town of Islip on Long Island, New York.  With approximately 350 homes within its 13-block town limits, the town features a few stores, a restaurant and a pizza shop, giving it old-style charm with the security of a state-of-the-art Fire Department and EMS. Moreover, the beach is wide, and the bay front is active.

History
The community was first founded in the late 1800s.
A few of Fair Harbor's 350 houses date to the 1920s, but most were built in the 1970s and many have been built recently.

Community
Fair Harbor—like most other Fire Island communities—is mainly a summer community, although a few families choose to live there year-round. Many of the homes have been passed down from generation to generation. The town has a strong summer rental market, with most houses renting for the entire summer season or by the month. During the off-season there is limited car access to Fire Island while during the summer there is no car access and the town can only be reached by ferry or private boat. Biking and walking are the main modes of transportation. Fair Harbor falls under the police jurisdiction of Suffolk County Marine Bureau and is protected by its own volunteer fire department, the Fair Harbor Fire Department, founded in 1931. During the summer months lifeguards are stationed on both the bay beach and ocean beach.
 Children of the year-round families attend the Fire Island School District in Corneille Estates until grade 6, at which point they are bussed to public or parochial schools in Bay Shore or Islip for grades 7–12. The neighboring communities of Dunewood and Lonelyville, to the east have no stores or services so they rely on many of Fair Harbor's services, such as the Fire Department and EMS and Fair Harbor's one grocery store, hardware emporium, liquor store and restaurant. The population in the summer swells to about 1,500.

Fair Harbor is famous for its annual Pine Walk Arts and Crafts Fair, a Fire Island favorite, which was established in 1972.  It adds to this community's bohemian beach vibe while still being an intimate family community where neighbors congregate at the bay to watch the sunsets. Some 400 modest yet gracious beach houses adorn the narrow residential walks. There are no hotels or B&B's in Fair Harbor, but they do have a thriving real estate agent industry and house rentals are readily available. Fair Harbor also has its own direct ferry line out of Bay Shore and  private community marina.

Economy
Being a seasonal community, Fair Harbor offers only a few services. The Pioneer Market is the only grocer in the hamlet; Le Dock, the only restaurant, is open for lunch and dinner and offers both indoor and outdoor dining. The Loading Dock sells liquor and wine, and Corliss on the Bay sells miscellaneous items including bikes, souvenirs, hardware, toys, magazines, books, paint, and garden items. There is also an ice cream store and a pizza take-out shop. These stores are open 7 days a week in season and closed during the off season (October through May).  There is also the Fair Harbor Clothing store, established by individuals who grew up a block away from Fair Harbor "in a barefoot community," developing a "deep appreciation for the water, waves and bounty of the sea."

Geography
Fair Harbor is located on the western part of Fire Island between the Great South Bay and the Atlantic Ocean. It is about 47 miles by car to the ferry dock in Bay Shore, NY. From there, it is six miles by ferry across the water to Fair Harbor. Saltaire is the incorporated village immediately west of Fair Harbor while Dunewood and Lonelyville are directly to the east. To get to Fair Harbor, it is necessary to take the ferry from Bay Shore.

Medical care

While there are no hospitals or clinics in the town, medical service is provided in the summer months by the Fair Harbor Medical District. The district hires doctors, on one week intervals, from Memorial Day through Labor Day. The district provides a walk-in doctor's office and doctor's residence. The doctors are not paid but get a free week at the beach, are allowed to keep modest fees from patients and have office hours two hours a day—from 11 to Noon and 5 to 6 PM. For medical emergencies, the Fair Harbor Fire Department provides emergency medical services (EMS) which transports patients by its ambulance or by Suffolk County Police boat to Good Samaritan or Southside hospitals on the mainland, or by SCPD helicopter.

References

Fire Island, New York
Islip (town), New York
Hamlets in New York (state)
Beaches of Suffolk County, New York
Hamlets in Suffolk County, New York
Populated coastal places in New York (state)